The Buick GL6 is a 6-seater compact MPV produced by Buick exclusively for the Chinese market. The GL6 is positioned below the successful GL8 to aim for the lower-priced MPV market. Pricing starts around $25,000 (estimate in U.S. dollars, converted from Chinese yuan).

References

External links 

 

GL6
Minivans
Cars of China
Front-wheel-drive vehicles
Cars introduced in 2017